The Faculty of Sciences is an Algerian faculty, located in the city of Boumerdès, Algeria.It is part of the University of Boumerdès. It was established in 1998.

History
Under the supervision of the Ministry of Industry and Energy, in 1964 they created the African center for hydrocarbons and textiles. Then in 1973 they divided the center into two national institutes:
 INHC: National Institute of Hydrocarbons and Chemistry (French: Institut National des Hydrocarbures et de la Chimie).
 INIL: National Institute of Light Industries (French: Institut National des Industries Légères).
in June 2, 1998 and by the executive decree n ° 98-189 they created the University of Boumerdès, and the National Institute of Light Industries becomes faculty of sciences.

Programs

Undergraduate
The undergraduate bachelor's degree program for the faculty of sciences is based on a 3-5 year program. Bachelor's degrees in Algerian universities are called "الليسانس" in Arabic or la licence in French; the degree normally takes three years to complete and is a part of the LMD ("license", "master", "doctorate") reform, students can enroll in a bachelor's degree program in different fields of study after having obtained their baccalauréat (the national secondary education test). After the licence each student can complete Master for two years. After which he will pass an exam for a doctorate.

Departments
The departments in faculty of sciences at the M'hamed Bougara University of Boumerdès are as follows:
Department of Chemistry
Department of Physics
Department of Mathematics
Department of Computer Science
Department of Biology

References

External links
 M'hamed Bougara University of Boumerdès: Faculty of Sciences

Sciences